The Western Bohemian Fraternal Union Hall is a historic clubhouse in Meadowlands Township, Minnesota, United States.  It was built in 1925 as a meeting hall for a lodge of the Western Bohemian Fraternal Union (Zapadni Ceska Bratrska Jednota), a society of Czech Americans.  The hall also served as a host for Sokol gymnastics events.  The hall was listed on the National Register of Historic Places in 1986 for its local significance in the themes of European ethnic heritage and social history.  It was nominated for being a long-serving rural venue for the preservation of Czech American culture and heritage.

See also
 National Register of Historic Places listings in St. Louis County, Minnesota

References

1925 establishments in Minnesota
Buildings and structures in St. Louis County, Minnesota
Clubhouses on the National Register of Historic Places in Minnesota
Cultural infrastructure completed in 1925
Czech-American culture in Minnesota
National Register of Historic Places in St. Louis County, Minnesota
Sokol in the United States
Western Fraternal Life Association